netMusicZone Records is a record company based in Bad Hindelang, Germany.  They are distributed by Rough Trade Distribution. Artists include Anne Clark and the Klaxons.

External links
 Rough Trade Distribution
 Discography

German record labels